Shangri-La is a recording studio in Malibu, California, currently owned by record producer Rick Rubin. Originally a ranch property with a bungalow owned by actress Margo, it was leased by The Band in the 1970s and converted to a recording studio by Rob Fraboni to the precise specifications of Bob Dylan and The Band. Interviews of The Band featured in Martin Scorsese's documentary The Last Waltz were filmed at Shangri-La. The property was purchased by Rick Rubin in 2011. Rubin and Shangri-La were the subject of a four-part documentary series, Shangri-La, which aired on Showtime in 2019.

History

In 1958, Mexican-American actress Margo bought a 1.73-acre property in the hills above Zuma Beach. A ranch house was built and the site was named Shangri-La Ranch. Margo starred in the film adaptation of James Hilton's 1933 classic novel Lost Horizon, from where the fabled paradise "Shangri-La" originated. The property was an upscale bordello for the 1950s Hollywood elite and a filming site for the TV show Mister Ed in the 1960s. In 1974, the ranch property was leased by Canadian-American roots rock band The Band. The master bedroom was converted to a recording studio by record producer and audio engineer Rob Fraboni and in-house technician Ed Anderson according to the precise specifications of Bob Dylan and The Band. The Band built it while taking time off after concluding the Bob Dylan and the Band 1974 Tour. Drummer Levon Helm later described Shangri-La as "a clubhouse and studio where we and our friends could record albums and cross-pollinate one another's music." They kept the name "Shangri-La" because to them, "Malibu felt like a paradise after years of gray Catskill winters" in upstate New York. The house came with a Naugahyde bar and bedrooms with mirrored walls, from Shangri-La's time as a bordello.

Shangri-La was a functioning studio by the end of 1974, with Larry Samuels working as studio manager. The Band's Robbie Robertson, Garth Hudson, and Rick Danko were living in houses near Shangri-La and were becoming involved in other outside projects. Levon Helm lived between Woodstock, New York, and Los Angeles, and used a bedroom at Shangri-La when he was in Malibu. Richard Manuel lived at Shangri-La for a year, living in a bungalow down toward Zuma Beach that was converted from the stable of Bamboo Harvester from Mister Ed. Manuel was heavily drinking Grand Marnier liqueur while living at Shangri-La.

In 1976, Rob Fraboni teamed up with partners and purchased the house for $195,000, turning it into a semicommercial studio. Shangri-La was a state-of-the-art 24-track studio, equipped with the latest synthesizers.

Interviews of The Band featured in Martin Scorsese's documentary The Last Waltz (1976) were filmed at Shangri-La.

The 24-track console allowed The Band keyboardist Garth Hudson to record multiple layers of keyboards on several tracks on their sixth studio album, Northern Lights – Southern Cross. Several albums were recorded under Fraboni's management, including Renée Geyer's So Lucky (1981), Bonnie Raitt's Green Light (1982), and Eric Clapton's No Reason to Cry (1976).

Clapton spent nearly three months at Shangri-La, hanging out and recording with The Band, Bob Dylan, Van Morrison, Ringo Starr, Pete Townshend, Joe Cocker, Billy Preston, Ronnie Wood, and Georgie Fame. Bob Dylan lived outside in a tent in the garden during Clapton's time at Shangri-La. Clapton formed a close friendship with Richard Manuel while at Shangri-La. Garth Hudson recorded overdubs at Shangri-La for Van Morrison's 10th studio album, Wavelength (1978).

In 1985, Rob Fraboni left Shangri-La to serve as vice president of Island Records. The studio's usage decreased dramatically after Fraboni's exit.

In the late 1990s, Blaine "Beej" Chaney of the Minneapolis new wave punk band The Suburbs purchased the property for $2,125,000. Over the next few years, he invested an additional $2 million into the studio, and with the help of producers Jim Niper and Pete Strobl, loaded it with the premium vintage audio equipment that is still in use today, including the centerpiece API 32 BUS console. Immediately following these renovations, Chaney invited Mark Knopfler to record there, where he went on to make his acclaimed album, Shangri-La. Also in 2003, they worked with Ethan Johns and Angelo Petraglia to record the debut album by Kings of Leon, Youth and Young Manhood.

In 2006, musician and producer Eric Lynn was invited to become Shangri-La's house engineer and studio manager. Chaney oversaw continued interest in the studio with a number of notable albums being recorded at Shangri-La, including Weezer's self-titled 2008 album, and Metallica's Death Magnetic. Following his divorce from Sarah Macmillan, a Cargill family heiress, Chaney took a more hands-off role in the studio. In 2009, he invited his friend and fellow musician and producer, Jake Coyle, to manage the day-to-day operations at Shangri-La, allowing Eric Lynn to focus entirely on running recording sessions day to day. Coyle facilitated increased interest and stability at Shangri-La during a tumultuous time for recording studios around LA, many of which permanently closed between 2009 and 2011. Shangri-La was now officially experiencing a renaissance with Rick Rubin continuing to rent the property for the majority of his projects including the Gossip's Music For Men, Adele's 21, Kid Rock's Born Free, and The Red Hot Chili Pepper's I'm With You.

In 2011, the studio and property were listed by Chaney for $4.1 million. Within weeks the price tag was cut drastically to $3,195,000. Rick Rubin purchased Shangri-La for $2 million in August 2011. Numerous artists have since recorded at Shangri-La under Rubin's ownership, including Adele, Ed Sheeran, Eminem, and Kanye West.

Shangri-La survived the 2018 Woolsey Fire, but Rubin's two nearby homes were lost to the fire.

Property and recording spaces
Shangri-La consists of four bedrooms, three bathrooms and two primary recording studios. The main studio has an API console and Neumann U87 microphones. The other recording space, a building called "The Chapel", also uses U87 microphones and has a console from Muscle Shoals Sound Studio which was formerly in Rubin's The Mansion studio in Laurel Canyon. The property also includes Bob Dylan's former tour bus, which is parked permanently and has been repurposed as a recording space.

Showtime documentary series

The studio and its owner Rick Rubin were the subject of the four-part documentary television series Shangri-La, which aired on Showtime in 2019. A "work-in-progress" cut of the docuseries was screened at the 2019 SXSW Festival. The first two episodes were directed by Morgan Neville, while the last two were directed by Jeff Malmberg.

List of artists recorded
Many artists have recorded at Shangri-La, including:

 Adele
 The Avett Brothers
 The Band
 Black Country Communion
 Black Sabbath
 James Blake
 Brockhampton
 Jake Bugg
 Daniel Caesar
 Eric Clapton
 Billy Corgan
 Neil Diamond
 Bob Dylan
 Eminem
 Kinky Friedman
 Dave Gahan
 Renée Geyer
 Gossip
 Josh Groban
 Hughes/Thrall
 Imagine Dragons
 Kid Rock
 Kings of Leon
 Mark Knopfler
 Lady Gaga
 Lana Del Rey
 The Last Shadow Puppets
 Lido
 Ian McLagan
 Metallica
 Keb' Mo'
 Monsters of Folk
 Muse
 Milton Nascimento
 Jennifer Nettles
 Porno for Pyros
 Bonnie Raitt
 Red Hot Chili Peppers
 Damien Rice
 Run the Jewels
 Santana
 Ed Sheeran
 Skinny Puppy
 The Smashing Pumpkins
 John Stewart
 Angus & Julia Stone
 The Strokes
 Harry Styles
 Kae Tempest
 Tonio K.
 Towkio
 Tyler, the Creator
 U2
 Jennifer Warnes
 Weezer
 Kanye West
 Neil Young
 ZZ Top

See also
 :Category:Albums recorded at Shangri-La (recording studio)

References

External links
 

Recording studios in California
Culture of Malibu, California
Buildings and structures in Malibu, California
Ranches in California
Houses in Los Angeles County, California
1958 establishments in California
The Band
Bob Dylan
Rick Rubin